Kaarma Parish was a municipality of Saare County, Estonia next to Kuressaare.  In 2014, it was merged with the municipalities of Kärla and Lümanda to become the Lääne-Saare municipality.

The municipality had a population of 4,608 (as of 1 January 2012) and covered an area of 400 km². It had 87 km of land border and 98 km of waterline.

Islands in Kaarma Parish: Abruka, Kasselaid, Linnusitamaa, Vahase, Väike-Tulpe.

Settlements
Kaarma Parish contains 70 settlements: 3 small boroughs and 67 villages.
Small boroughs
Aste - Kudjape - Nasva
Villages
Abruka - Anijala - Ansi - Aste - Asuküla - Aula-Vintri - Eikla - Endla - Haamse - Hakjala - Hübja - Irase - Jootme - Jõe - Kaarma - Kaarmise - Kaisvere - Kasti - Kaubi - Kellamäe - Keskranna - Keskvere - Kiratsi - Kirikuküla - Koidu - Koidula - Kuke - Kungla - Käku - Kärdu - Laadjala - Laheküla - Laoküla - Lilbi - Maleva - Meedla - Metsaküla - Mullutu - Muratsi - Mändjala - Mõisaküla - Nõmme - Paimala - Parila - Piila - Praakli - Pähkla - Pärni - Põlluküla - Randvere - Saia - Sepa - Sikassaare - Tahula - Tamsalu - Tõlli - Tõrise - Tõru - Uduvere - Unimäe - Upa - Vaivere - Vantri - Vatsküla - Vestla - Viira - Õha

International relations

Twin towns — Sister cities
 Väike-Maarja Parish, Estonia

See also
Municipalities of Estonia
List of municipalities of Estonia

References

External links
 

Former municipalities of Estonia